Boiler room may refer to:

 Boiler room (building), a room or space in a building for mechanical equipment and its associated electrical equipment
 Boiler room (business), a busy centre of activity, often selling questionable goods by telephone
 Boiler Room (band), a nu metal band formed in 1996
 Boiler Room (film), a 2000 U.S. film
 Boiler Room (music project), a music project launched in London in 2010
 Boiler room (ship), a compartment on a steamship that houses the boiler
 Boiler Room, a restaurant launched by Vivian Howard
 "The Boiler Room", an episode of the Tanner '88 television series
 "The Boiler Room", an animated short from the TV series Mickey Mouse and Friends
 "The Boiler Room", a 2017 music album by Jarv & Thief